Sinaphaenops is a genus of beetles in the family Carabidae, containing the following species:

 Sinaphaenops banshanicus Tian, Chen & Tang, 2017
 Sinaphaenops bidraconis Ueno, 2002
 Sinaphaenops gracilior Ueno & Ran, 1998
 Sinaphaenops mirabissimus Ueno & Wang, 1991
 Sinaphaenops mochongensis Tian & Huang, 2015
 Sinaphaenops orthogenys Ueno, 2002
 Sinaphaenops pilosulus Deuve & Tian, 2008
 Sinaphaenops pulcherrimus (Magrini, Vanni & Zanon, 1997)
 Sinaphaenops trisetiger Ueno, 2002
 Sinaphaenops wangorum Ueno & Ran, 1998
 Sinaphaenops yaolinensis Tian, Chen & Yang, 2017

References

Trechinae